Natale Chiaudani (born 13 September 1960) is an Italian former equestrian. He competed in two events at the 1996 Summer Olympics.

References

External links
 

1960 births
Living people
Italian male equestrians
Olympic equestrians of Italy
Equestrians at the 1996 Summer Olympics
Competitors at the 1997 Mediterranean Games
Competitors at the 2005 Mediterranean Games
People from Tortona
Mediterranean Games medalists in equestrian
Mediterranean Games gold medalists for Italy
Mediterranean Games silver medalists for Italy
Sportspeople from the Province of Alessandria